Kar(e)l Faustin Klostermann (13 February 1848 in Haag am Hausruck, Upper Austria, Austrian Empire – 17 July 1923 in Štěkeň, Czechoslovakia) was a Czech-Austrian writer. He wrote under the alias Faustin.

From 1857 to 1865 Klostermann went to school in Písek, a town in the South Bohemian Region of what is now the Czech Republic. He studied medicine until 1869 in Vienna, and was later active as a teacher of German and French at the German high school in Plzeň. He first wrote his works in German; later he turned to the Czech language and wrote novellas about the inhabitants of the middle Bohemian Forest. This can be found in the collection V srdci šumavských hvozdů ("In the heart of the Šumava"). Some of his novellas are set in and around the town of Kašperské Hory.

Selected works 

 Ze světa lesních samot (From the world of forest solitude) - 1891
 Syn svobodného soudce (The son of the free judge) 
 Pěst v příbězích (Fist in stories)

References 

1848 births
1923 deaths
People from Grieskirchen District
Czech male writers
Austrian male writers
Czech-language writers
Czech writers in German
Czech people of Austrian descent
Austrian people of Czech descent
German people of Czech descent
German people of Austrian descent
German Bohemian people
German male writers